KTPV-LP (96.9 FM) was a radio station licensed to serve Prairie Grove, Arkansas. The station was owned by Foundation for the Preservation of the Individual. It aired a Spanish language Religious radio format.

The station was assigned the KTPV-LP call letters by the Federal Communications Commission (FCC) on March 17, 2003.

The station's license was cancelled by the FCC on June 2, 2020, for failure to file a license renewal application.

References

External links
 
KTPV-LP service area per the FCC database

TPV-LP
TPV-LP
TPV-LP
Washington County, Arkansas
Radio stations established in 2005
Radio stations disestablished in 2020
2005 establishments in Arkansas
2020 disestablishments in Arkansas
Defunct radio stations in the United States
TPV-LP
Defunct religious radio stations in the United States